Kostyantyn Romanovych Bychek (born 21 April 2000) is a Ukrainian professional footballer who plays as an attacking midfielder for Ukrainian club Metalist 1925 Kharkiv.

References

External links
 
 

2000 births
Living people
People from Bila Tserkva
Ukrainian footballers
Association football midfielders
FC Olimpik Donetsk players
FC Karpaty Lviv players
FC Nyva Ternopil players
FC Metalist 1925 Kharkiv players
Ukrainian Premier League players
Ukrainian First League players
Ukrainian Second League players
Sportspeople from Kyiv Oblast